Giordano Bruno is a 1973 Italian biographical-drama film directed by Giuliano Montaldo. It was produced by Carlo Ponti.

The film, which does not shy from presenting libidinous aspects of his behaviour,  chronicles the last years of life of the philosopher Giordano Bruno (1548-1600), from the year 1592, when his ideas drew the attention of guardians of Roman Catholic doctrines, to his execution in 1600.

Cast 
Gian Maria Volonté: Giordano Bruno
Charlotte Rampling: Fosca
Renato Scarpa: Fra' Tragagliolo
Mathieu Carrière: Orsini
Hans Christian Blech: Sartori
Giuseppe Maffioli: Arsenalotto
Mark Burns: Bellarmino
Massimo Foschi: Fra Celestino
Paolo Bonacelli
José Quaglio 
Corrado Gaipa

References

External links

Alternative poster at this address: https://letterboxd.com/film/giordano-bruno/

1973 films
Biographical films about philosophers
Biographical films about scientists
Films about capital punishment
Films about Catholicism
Films scored by Ennio Morricone
Films directed by Giuliano Montaldo
Films set in Rome
Films set in the 1590s
Films set in the 1600s
Films set in Venice
Italian biographical films
Cultural depictions of Giordano Bruno
1970s Italian films